Scituate is a town in Providence County, Rhode Island, United States. The population was 10,384 at the 2020 census.

History
Scituate was first settled in 1710 by emigrants from Scituate, Massachusetts. The original spelling of the town's name was "Satuit", a native Indian word meaning "cold brook" or "cold river."  The town was a part of Providence until 1731.
 
Scituate's first town meeting was held at the Angell Tavern in South Scituate, with Stephen Hopkins elected as the first moderator and Joseph Brown as clerk. Stephen Hopkins later became a governor of Rhode Island and was a signer of the Declaration of Independence.  His brother, Esek Hopkins, was Commander in Chief of the Continental Navy beginning in 1776. In 1788 Scituate representative, militia general and Supreme Court Justice William West led an armed anti-federalist mob of farmers into Providence to protest the U.S. Constitution.  In 1791 the U.S. Supreme Court decided its first case, West v. Barnes,  regarding a farm in Scituate.

Scituate was once made up of a multitude of small villages, including North Scituate, Hope, Ashland, Clayville, Elmdale, Fiskeville, Glenn Rock, Harrisdale, Jackson, Kent, Ponaganset, Potterville, Richmond, Rockland, Saundersville, and South Scituate.  Foster was incorporated as a separate town in 1781, taking the western half of Scituate.

In 1915, the Rhode Island General Assembly voted to take  of land in Scituate (38% of the town) to create a reservoir to supply fresh water to greater Providence. This project resulted in the condemnation of "1,195 buildings, including 375 houses, seven schools, six churches, six mills, thirty dairy farms, eleven ice houses, post offices, and an electric railway system, the Providence and Danielson Railway system". (2) The hamlets of Kent, Richmond, Rockland, South Scituate, Ashland, Saundersville, Ponaganset and parts of North Scituate and Clayville disappeared forever.

Scituate has played an important role in many of the United States wars. During the Revolutionary War, 76 cannons were forged at the Hope Furnace in the village of Hope in southern Scituate. During World War II, a Federal Communications Commission Radio Intelligence Division monitoring facility on Darby Road near Chopmist Hill intercepted German HF communications. Because of this, in 1946, the Chopmist Hill area was considered as a candidate for the location of the headquarters of the United Nations.

Geography
According to the United States Census Bureau, the town has a total area of 54.8 square miles (141.9 km2), of which, 48.7 square miles (126.1 km2) of it is land and 6.1 square miles (15.8 km2) of it (11.15%) is water.

Scituate Reservoir

One of the most prominent features of the town is the Scituate Reservoir.  The large reservoir spans a large portion of Scituate and has forever changed the face of the town.  During construction of the reservoir, numerous villages were flooded along the former banks of the Pawtuxet River. Some foundations of the old structures are still visible today during times of drought.  The reservoir, and a large portion of land surrounding, it is owned and maintained by the Providence Water Supply Board.

The main Scituate reservoir was formed by the construction of a dam across the Pawtuxet River at the former village of Kent. Water storage in the reservoir began on November 10, 1925. An aqueduct from the dam feeds the nearby treatment plant which was placed in operation on September 30, 1926.

The Scituate Reservoir is the largest artificial freshwater body of water in the state of Rhode Island. It and its six tributary reservoirs—which make up a total surface area of —supply drinking water to more than 60 percent of the state population. The Scituate Reservoir is operated by Providence Water Supply Board.

The original treatment plant was state-of-the-art at the time of its construction. The plant was considered to be among the most technologically advanced of its day, and for many years the filtration system was the only plant of its type in New England. As demand continued to grow, the treatment plant underwent major expansions and renovations in the 1940s and again in the 1960s.

Politics
Scituate is the most Republican town in Rhode Island. In the 2008 U.S. presidential election, Scituate was the only town in Rhode Island to vote for John McCain, 51%–47% over Barack Obama. It is the only town in Rhode Island to vote Republican in every presidential election since 2000.

In the 2016 Presidential election, Donald Trump won 60.2% of the vote in Scituate. Opponent Hillary Clinton received 34.8% of the town vote.

Demographics

As of the census of 2000, there were 10,324 people, 3,780 households, and 2,929 families residing in the town. The racial makeup of the town was 98.13% White, 0.29% African American, 0.07% Native American, 0.58% Asian, 0.03% Pacific Islander, 0.32% from other races, and 0.58% from two or more races. Hispanic or Latino of any race were 0.75% of the population.

There were 3,780 households, out of which 36.2% had children under the age of 18 living with them, 67.3% were married couples living together, 7.5% had a female householder with no husband present, and 22.5% were non-families. 18.5% of all households were made up of individuals, and 7.7% had someone living alone who was 65 years of age or older.  The average household size was 2.72 and the average family size was 3.12.

In the town, the population was spread out, with 25.5% under the age of 18, 5.9% from 18 to 24, 28.8% from 25 to 44, 27.7% from 45 to 64, and 12.0% who were 65 years of age or older.  The median age was 40 years. For every 100 females, there were 96.3 males.  For every 100 females age 18 and over, there were 94.4 males.

The median income for a household in the town was $60,788, and the median income for a family was $67,593. Males had a median income of $42,392 versus $30,703 for females. The per capita income for the town was $28,092.  About 2.0% of families and 3.9% of the population were below the poverty line, including 4.3% of those under age 18 and 5.5% of those age 65 or over.

Education

In 1839, the Smithville Seminary, a Freewill Baptist institution was founded in North Scituate and existed on and off as an educational institution until it finally closed in 1876. The Pentecostal Collegiate Institute then moved to the former campus from Saratoga Springs, New York in 1902. When PCI became Eastern Nazarene College and left in 1919, William Holland purchased the property and moved his Watchman Industrial School and Camp there in 1923. It was allegedly burned several times by the local Ku Klux Klan in the 1920s and 1930s and closed in 1938, although the summer camp operated until 1974. The Greek Revival buildings and campus are now the Scituate Commons, an apartment complex on Institute Lane.

High school students in Scituate go to Scituate High School (Rhode Island).

Scituate Art Festival

The Scituate Art Festival, held every Columbus Day weekend since 1967, features over 300 artists and craftspeople displaying and selling their artwork in the picturesque New England village.  Visitors number in the 200,000 to 350,000 range per festival.  The Old Congregational Church grounds are used for part of the festival.

National Historic Places and Notable Sites
Andrews–Luther Farm (1768)
Dexter Arnold Farmstead (1813)
Battey–Barden House
Clayville Historic District
Amos Cooke House (1812)

Double L Site, RI-958
Hope Village Historic District
McGonagle Site, RI-1227
Millrace Site, RI-1039
Moswansicut Pond Site, RI-960
Old Congregational Church (North Scituate, Rhode Island) (1834)
Rhode Island State Police Headquarters
Smithville Seminary (1839)
Smithville – North Scituate
Woonasquatucket River Site (RI-163)

Notable people

James Burrill Angell, president of the University of Michigan and University of Vermont
Emerson C. Angell, American dentist
Robert Capron, Rowley Jefferson in the Diary of a Wimpy Kid film series
Ezekiel Cornell, delegate to the Continental Congress
Esek Hopkins, Revolutionary War sailor
Stephen Hopkins, colonial governor of Rhode Island; signer of the Declaration of Independence
Fenner Kimball, Wisconsin State assemblyman
Armand LaMontagne, wood sculptor
Archibald Molbone, Medal of Honor recipient
Arthur Steere, businessman and politician
William West, Revolutionary War General, Lt. Governor of Rhode Island, Chief Justice of Rhode Island

References

External links
 Town of Scituate official website

 
Towns in Providence County, Rhode Island
Providence metropolitan area
Towns in Rhode Island